This is a list of Sheriffs of Bedfordshire and Buckinghamshire. One sheriff was appointed for both counties from 1125 until the end of 1575 (except for 1165–1166), after which separate sheriffs were appointed. See High Sheriff of Bedfordshire and High Sheriff of Buckinghamshire for dates before 1125 or after 1575.

1125–1199

1200–1299

1300–1399

1400–1499

1500–1574

See also
 High Sheriff of Bedfordshire
 High Sheriff of Buckinghamshire

References

Bibliography
 (with amendments of 1963, Public Record Office)

Bedfordshire
Lists of office-holders in the United Kingdom
History of Bedfordshire
History of Buckinghamshire